Watson Township may refer to the following places:

In Canada

 Watson Township, Cochrane District, Ontario

In the United States

 Watson Township, Effingham County, Illinois
 Watson Township, Allegan County, Michigan
 Watson Township, Cass County, North Dakota
 Watson Township, Lycoming County, Pennsylvania
 Watson Township, Warren County, Pennsylvania

See also

Watson (disambiguation)

Township name disambiguation pages